Čizmić is a Croatian surname. Notable people with the surname include:

Leo Čizmić (born 1998), Israeli-born Croatian basketball player, son of Teo
Teo Čizmić (born 1971), Croatian basketball player and coach

Croatian surnames